Under the Influence is the second mixtape by Odd Future member Domo Genesis. The mixtape was made available for free download on September 20, 2011 at 4:20 pm P.S.T. The mixtape features Domo Genesis rapping over some of his favorite beats, with several original songs also included. Casey Veggies, Remy Banks and fellow Odd Future member Tyler, The Creator have features on the mixtape.

Track listing

Notes
 The reverse cover mistakenly labels "Benediction" as produced by Uzowuru instead of "Mind Games"
 Tyler is credited as Ace on track 6

References 

2011 mixtape albums
Odd Future
Albums produced by Tha Bizness
Albums produced by Michael Uzowuru